Something for the Weekend is a British game show presented by Denise van Outen. It was broadcast on Channel 4 from 17 September 1999 to 21 July 2000.

Well-remembered items on the show included a game called Private Dicks and van Outen revealing she used the pet name Godzilla for then-partner Jay Kay's privates, because he "takes [her] deeper underground".

Transmissions

Specials

Reception
The show was critically panned. Since then van Outen has distanced herself from the show.

References

External links

1999 British television series debuts
2000 British television series endings
1990s British game shows
2000s British game shows
Channel 4 game shows
Television series by Banijay
Television series by Tiger Aspect Productions